Deng Qidong (January 1938 – 6 November 2018) was a Chinese geologist.

Biography
Deng was born in Shuangfeng County, Hunan in 1938. After graduating from the Central South University in 1961, he was assigned to the Institute of Geology, Chinese Academy of Sciences. He joined the Communist Party of China on 25 May 1961. From February 1978 to March 1998 he worked in the China Earthquake Administration, where he was appointed director of Graduate Degree Committee of Geological Research Institute. In 2003 he was elected a fellow of the Chinese Academy of Sciences. He died of illness at Beijing 301 Hospital, in Beijing, on 6 November 2018.

Papers

Awards
 1978 Second Prize of the State Scientific and Technological Progress Award

References

1938 births
2018 deaths
Central South University alumni
20th-century Chinese geologists
Members of the Chinese Academy of Sciences
People from Shuangfeng County
Scientists from Hunan